Highway 371 is a highway in the Canadian province of Saskatchewan. It runs from the Alberta border, where it continues as Alberta Highway 537, to Highway 21 near Fox Valley.

Major intersections
From west to east:

References

371